Ottowia oryzae is a Gram-negative, non-spore-forming, short-rod-shaped and non-motile bacterium from the genus Ottowia which has been isolated from Andong sikhye from Korea.

References

Comamonadaceae
Bacteria described in 2018